Huang Kaifeng (born 21 December 1997) is a Chinese rower. She competed in the 2020 Summer Olympics.

References

1997 births
Living people
Rowers at the 2020 Summer Olympics
Chinese female rowers
Olympic rowers of China
Sportspeople from Xuzhou